

List of colonial heads of Cacheu

The territory is located in Guinea-Bissau.

See also
Guinea-Bissau
Heads of State of Guinea-Bissau
Heads of Government of Guinea-Bissau
Colonial Heads of Portuguese Guinea
Colonial Heads of Bissau
lists of incumbents
List of national leaders

Cacheu
Cacheu
Cacheu
Cacheu
Cacheu